= Royal County =

Royal County may refer to:

- Berkshire in England
- County Meath in Ireland
